Jeremy Strong (born December 25, 1978) is an American actor. He is best known for his role as Kendall Roy in the television series Succession (2018–present), for which he has won a Primetime Emmy Award for Outstanding Lead Actor in a Drama Series in 2020 and a Golden Globe Award for Best Actor – Television Series Drama in 2022. Time magazine named him one of the 100 most influential people in the world in 2022.

Strong started his acting career at Yale College. After briefly studying at both the Royal Academy of Dramatic Arts in London and the Steppenwolf Theatre Company in Chicago, he acted in various plays at the Williamstown Theatre Festival. His first off-Broadway performance was in John Patrick Shanley's Defiance in 2006. His Broadway debut came as Richard Rich, 1st Baron Rich in 2008 revival of A Man for All Seasons. The same year, Strong made his film debut in Humboldt County.

Strong has appeared in a number of acclaimed films portraying people such as John George Nicolay in Steven Spielberg's Lincoln (2012), Lee Harvey Oswald in Peter Landesman's Parkland (2013), James Reeb in Ava DuVernay's Selma (2014), and Jerry Rubin in Aaron Sorkin's The Trial of the Chicago 7 (2020). He also appeared in Kathryn Bigelow's Zero Dark Thirty (2012), Adam McKay's The Big Short (2015), Sorkin's  Molly's Game (2017) and James Gray's Armageddon Time (2022).

Early life and education
Strong was born in Boston, Massachusetts on Christmas Day in 1978 to Maureen and David Strong. His mother worked as a hospice nurse, and his father worked in juvenile jails. He lived in a "rough neighborhood" in Jamaica Plain, a place he often regarded as "somewhere I just wanted to get out of". His family was working class. Since his parents could not afford to go on vacations outside the Boston area, they put a canoe on cinder blocks in the family's backyard; Strong and his brothers would often sit in it and pretend to take trips. 

When Strong was 10, his parents moved the family to the suburb of Sudbury, Massachusetts, for better schools. Strong recalled Sudbury as "a kind of country-club town where we didn't belong to the country club". His interest in acting began there, as he became involved with a children's theater group and performing in musicals.

Among his costars in the children's theater group was Chris Evans' older sister; Evans remembers being impressed by Strong's performances. Later, Evans and Strong acted with each other in a high school production of A Midsummer Night's Dream.

Strong particularly idolized actors Daniel Day-Lewis, Al Pacino, and Dustin Hoffman—all famous for the lengths they went to preparing for roles—putting posters of their films on his bedroom wall and avidly following news of their careers as well as reading every interview they gave. When the 1996 film version of Arthur Miller's The Crucible was filmed near Boston, starring Day-Lewis, Strong got a job on the film's greenery crew—at one point holding up a branch outside a window during the filming of a scene. Later, he worked on the sound crew for Amistad, holding a boom mike over Anthony Hopkins as he made a speech, and he helped to edit Pacino's directorial debut Looking for Richard.

After high school, Strong applied to colleges with a letter of recommendation from DreamWorks, which had made Amistad. He was accepted at Yale University and granted a scholarship, intending to study drama. On his first day in class, he found the professor's discussions of Konstantin Stanislavski and accompanying blackboard illustrations so alienating that he decided immediately to change his major to English.

Strong continued to act and starred in a number of plays at Yale, all of them produced through the student-run Yale Dramatic Association, known as Dramat. The plays were all ones that Pacino had performed, such as American Buffalo, The Indian Wants the Bronx, and Hughie. Offstage, Strong arranged a visit from Pacino that other members of Dramat state did not go well and was budgeted so extravagantly that it nearly bankrupted their organization. Despite claiming not to remember the cost overruns, Strong admitted to being a "rogue agent" in planning the event.

During one summer at Yale, Strong received an internship with Hoffman's production company. He also studied at the Royal Academy of Dramatic Art in London and the Steppenwolf Theatre Company in Chicago.

Career

2001–2008: Early years on stage

After Yale, Strong moved to New York in 2001. He lived in a small apartment in SoHo, above a restaurant where he waited tables. Strong described it as a state of "gilded squalor" in the words of Francis Bacon, with little but his bed, books, and a closet with expensive clothing. When not working he persuaded local FedEx offices to give him some free envelopes in which he put headshots and recordings of himself performing monologues to distribute them to talent agencies. For almost a year, he got no calls for auditions. In an attempt to get representation, Strong contacted his former high school classmate Chris Evans, who had become successful after Not Another Teen Movie. Evans set up a meeting between Strong and his agent at Creative Artists Agency, who chose not to sign Strong.

The following summer, Strong got a spot in the summer company at the Williamstown Theatre Festival in western Massachusetts. Strong continued to work offstage in theater and film. In 2003, his position as an assistant at an independent film production company led to his serve as Day-Lewis's personal assistant on The Ballad of Jack and Rose, released two years later. On set, he was so devoted to attending to Day-Lewis, who lived apart from his family during the shoot, that crew members nicknamed him Cletus after the Simpsons character, for his focus on menial tasks. Strong has stated that at the end of the shoot, Day-Lewis wrote him a note "that contains many of what have become my most deeply held precepts and beliefs about this work". He has not publicized the contents of the note out of respect for Day-Lewis.
 
Strong returned to Williamstown in 2004 when he was cast with Jessica Chastain, Chris Messina, and Michelle Williams in The Cherry Orchard. He became friends with all three actors, and for intermittent periods in the late 2000s, he lived in the basement of Williams' townhouse in the Brooklyn neighborhood of Boerum Hill when he could not afford to live anywhere. During the mid-2000s, he worked as a typist for playwright Wendy Wasserstein. At night, he performed the role of an alcoholic Irishman in a one-man Conor McPherson play in a small bar in Midtown Manhattan. After Wasserstein discovered how much time Strong was spending observing her building's Irish doorman for the part, she considered writing a play based on Strong and the doorman but was unable to proceed with it before her death in 2006.

By that time, Strong had begun getting off-Broadway roles. He took part in Marine weapons training at Camp Lejeune to prepare for his role as a marine in John Patrick Shanley's Defiance and immersed himself in early 17th-century Dutch philosophy to play a young Baruch Spinoza in David Ives's New Jerusalem in 2008. Also in 2008, Strong was asked to understudy with six hours' notice for an actor who had a family emergency; by the next night, he had memorized all the character's lines. He received favorable notice for this performance, and he was able to sign with an agent.

2009–present: Film and Succession
Later in 2008, Strong made his Broadway debut in A Man for All Seasons. He was chosen as the 2008/2009 Leonore Annenberg Fellow by Lincoln Center Theater and nominated for the Lucille Lortel Award for Outstanding Lead Actor twice within a three-year period. Strong's Defiance role helped secure his first film role in Humboldt County. He appeared in films such as Lincoln alongside Day-Lewis as Lincoln's secretary John George Nicolay, Zero Dark Thirty, Selma, and The Trial of the Chicago 7. He also appeared in Guy Ritchie's The Gentlemen, a film that he did not want to discuss on the record with The New Yorker.

Strong was set to play a leading role in a major film for the first time in Kathryn Bigelow's Detroit as a soldier and practiced his marksmanship in preparation, but was fired from the film after the first day of shooting because, according to Bigelow, "the character wasn’t working in the story". Strong later persuaded her to give him another part in the film.

Strong's role in the Adam McKay film The Big Short led McKay to offer him a part in the TV series Succession. He initially was interested in playing Roman Roy, the family's wisecracking youngest son, but after the part was given to Kieran Culkin, Strong auditioned for the part of the middle son Kendall Roy. Strong's performance in the role has received universal acclaim from critics, and his performance won him a Primetime Emmy Award for Outstanding Lead Actor in a Drama Series in 2020.

In November 2021, it was reported that Strong was to star in and produce The Best of Us, about the 9/11 first responders.

Acting philosophy and technique
Like his idols Daniel Day-Lewis and Dustin Hoffman, Strong prepares intensely for his roles, often to replicate some aspect of the character whether or not it is prominent in his portrayal. He has stated that "I think you have to go through whatever the ordeal is that the character has to go through." For The Judge, where he played the main character's autistic younger brother, he spent time with an autistic man like Hoffman had for Rain Man, and he requested personalized props for the character that were not mentioned in the script. "All I know is, he crosses the Rubicon," stated Robert Downey Jr., his costar in The Judge. In preparation for his Succession audition for Kendall Roy, he read Michael Wolff's biography of media mogul Rupert Murdoch and his family, which mentions that Murdoch's son James is known for lacing his shoes very tightly; Strong thus did the same for the audition, believing that it expressed the character's "inner tensile strength".

Strong's devotion to his craft occasionally has led to personal injury. In the first season of Succession, Kendall had to run a considerable distance to be present at an important corporate board meeting after his limousine gets stuck in traffic. Because Strong wanted to be genuinely sweaty and breathless in every take, he ran as fast and far as he could in Tom Ford dress shoes and fractured his foot. Two seasons later, he jumped off a  platform, wearing Gucci shoes while filming "Too Much Birthday", impacting his tibia and femur and requiring a leg brace. The take ultimately was not used.

Strong seldom rehearses, saying he wants "every scene to feel like I'm encountering a bear in the woods", an approach he admits may not be popular with his costars. On The Trial of the Chicago 7, Strong asked to be sprayed with tear gas. Director Aaron Sorkin stated “I don’t like saying no to Jeremy...But there were 200 people in that scene and another seventy on the crew, so I declined to spray them with poison gas.”

On Succession, Strong intentionally deepened his alienation from the rest of the cast by timing his visits to the makeup trailer so that he is the only one there at the time. His costar Kieran Culkin has described Strong as being in "a bubble" before shoots: "It's hard for me to actually describe his process because I don't really see it." Culkin has stated that Strong's methods are not intrusive to his own process. Matthew Macfadyen has described Strong's techniques as "not the main event...That’s not to say that’s wrong. That’s just not useful." Brian Cox, who portrays Strong's character's father on the show, has expressed his concerns that Strong's intense approach to acting may lead to early burnout. However, he added that Strong's approach "is always extraordinary and excellent."

Such techniques are often referred to as method acting, but Strong prefers the term "identity diffusion" because he does not draw on his own life experience. "If I have any method at all, it is simply this: to clear away anything—anything—that is not the character and the circumstances of the scene...And usually that means clearing away almost everything around and inside you, so that you can be a more complete vessel for the work at hand." He quoted jazz pianist Keith Jarrett to explain his approach to acting: "I connect every music-making experience I have, including every day here in the studio, with a great power, and if I do not surrender to it nothing happens."

Strong admits the intensity he brings to his work might cause him problems, and he has stated "I don't know if I even believe in balance...I believe in extremity." His wife, a psychiatrist, disagrees with this claim: "He does a really good job of maintaining what he’s doing but also creating a space for the family and a normal life."

Personal life
In 2016, Strong married Emma Wall, a Danish psychiatrist; they had met four years earlier at a party in New York during Hurricane Sandy. They have three daughters, born in April 2018, November 2019, and September 2021. They reside in New York and have homes in Copenhagen, and Tisvilde.

Filmography

Film

Television

Theatre

Awards and nominations

References

External links
 
 
 

1978 births
21st-century American male actors
Alumni of RADA
American expatriates in Denmark
American male film actors
American male stage actors
American male television actors
Best Drama Actor Golden Globe (television) winners
Living people
Male actors from Boston
Method actors
Outstanding Performance by a Cast in a Motion Picture Screen Actors Guild Award winners
Outstanding Performance by a Lead Actor in a Drama Series Primetime Emmy Award winners
Yale University alumni